Buddhist Yip Kei Nam Memorial College (Chinese: 佛敎葉紀南紀念中學) is the first secondary school on the Tsing Yi Island in the New Territories of Hong Kong. Located in Cheung Ching Estate, the school was founded by Hong Kong Buddhist Association in September 1978 with buildings from Hong Kong Government and funds from Yip Hon (葉漢), a tycoon in Hong Kong and Macau. The school was named after Yip Hon's father, Yip Kei Nam (葉紀南).

The school is in adjacent to Father Cucchiara Memorial School, Cheung Chi Cheong Memorial Primary School and Ching Yeung House in Cheung Ching Estate.

External links

Official websites (in Chinese)

Educational institutions established in 1978
Secondary schools in Hong Kong
Tsing Yi
1978 establishments in Hong Kong
Buddhist schools in Hong Kong
Hong Kong Buddhist Association schools